Helen Cargill Thompson (12 December 1933 – 28 September 2020) was a Scottish scientist, librarian, art collector and supporter of educational, artistic and heritage organisations.

Early life 
Born in Burma where her father worked as a merchant trader, in 1939, Thompson, her parents and two brothers returned to Glasgow to live with her grandparents in Mirrlees Drive, close to Glasgow Botanic Gardens. Her great grand-uncle David Sime Cargill was the founder of Burmah Oil., the Cargills having started as East India merchants in Glasgow and merchant traders in Ceylon (today's Sri Lanka) where the business was known as the 'Harrods of Colombo'. Her older brother, William David James Cargill Thompson, was a professor of ecclesiastical history at King's College, London, and her younger brother, John Cargill Thompson, was a playwright.

Education 
Thompson attended Cheltenham Ladies College, then studied physiology and pharmacology at St Andrews University, and went on to do a PhD at Edinburgh University involving research into the contraceptive pill.

Career 
Thompson worked for ten years as a research scientist, then changed career in a response to a campaign to recruit scientists to work in libraries as information officers. In 1970 she started her librarianship training in the Andersonian Library at Strathclyde University. On August 5, 1982 she became head of the Andersonian Library’s new Reference and Information Division, a post she held until her retirement in 1999.

Interests 
Dr Thompson began collecting art in 1985, often buying from the degree shows in Glasgow. In 2000 she gifted her collection of nearly 1,000 artworks to Strathclyde University. It included works by Peter Howson, Avril Paton, James McDonald, and Neil MacPherson.

Helen Cargill Thompson was a member of, and donor to, many organisations, including: 
 Glasgow and West of Scotland Family History Society
 University of Glasgow Friends of the Library
 3LS Architecture and Design Club
 Charity Education International
 Architectural Heritage Society Of Scotland
 Scottish Pakistani Association
 Graduates’ Association of Strathclyde University
 National Trust for Scotland
 National Library of Scotland, John Murray Archive

Death 
Cargill died in Glasgow in September 2020. She left her house in Glasgow to the National Trust of Scotland.

Glasgow City Heritage hosted a talk on Wednesday 16 December 2020 entitled 'James Miller by Fergus Sutherland: A tribute to Dr. Helen Cargill Thompson'

The National Trust for Scotland Glasgow Members' Centre held a talk on Wednesday 13 January 2021 "in memory of our past chairman Dr. Helen Cargill Thomson who died in 2020" by Fergus Sutherland entitled Industrial Pleasures: the Development of Mass Entertainment in Victorian Glasgow.

Her funeral service took place at Maryhill Crematorium on 15 October. The service was conducted by Cargill's nephew, Father Edmund Cargill Thompson.

References 

1933 births
2020 deaths
Scottish philanthropists
Scottish librarians
Scottish art collectors
Scottish women scientists
British women librarians